Lake Trust Credit Union is a community-based credit union headquartered in Brighton, Michigan. It is a not-for-profit financial cooperative owned by members of the credit union and regulated under the authority of the National Credit Union Administration (NCUA). The organization is governed and supervised by an 18-member board of directors. The earliest predecessor of Lake Trust Credit Union was Detroit Edison Credit Union, which was chartered in 1944. In 2010, Detroit Edison merged with NuUnion Credit Union to establish Lake Trust Credit Union.

As of September 2015, Lake Trust Credit Union has twenty-one branches, a membership of more than 167,000, and assets of over $1.6 billion. It ranks in the top 1% of credit unions nationwide and it is the fourth largest credit union in Michigan in terms of asset size. In September 2015, Lake Trust opened a new headquarters in Brighton, Michigan to join their employees who were split between corporate offices located in Lansing, Plymouth, and Brighton. Lake Trust employs nearly 400 people and it was recognized in September 2015 as one of "The Best Credit Unions to Work For" by Credit Union Journal.

History 
The earliest predecessor of Lake Trust Credit Union was Detroit Edison Credit Union, which was chartered in 1944. Lake Trust uses 1944 as their charter date. In November 2007, Detroit Edison completed the purchase and assumption of Huron River Area Credit Union. On April 1, 2010, Detroit Edison merged with NuUnion Credit Union to establish Lake Trust Credit Union. NuUnion had been a 2004 merger of State Employees Credit Union and Ottawa County School Employees Credit Union. William Thiess became the President of Lake Trust while Stephan Winningerwill became CEO. Thiess and Winningerwill had been President and CEO of Detroit Edison and NuUnion, respectively. A year after the merger, Winninger and Thiess retired from the company. David Snodgrass, a former executive at Affinity Federal Credit Union in New Jersey, was named President and CEO of Lake Trust.

Lake Trust Credit Union was the first credit union in America to enable Mastercard’s Masterpass digital wallet. The organization had piloted MasterPass since February 2013 in association with PSCU.

On March 20, 2013, Lake Trust Credit Union announced that they would be building a new $30 million headquarters in Brighton, Michigan. The site includes a new 100,000 square foot building designed to more efficiently and effectively join their employees who were split between corporate offices located in Lansing, Michigan, Plymouth, Michigan and Brighton. President and CEO David Snodgrass said the credit union expects to save around $7 million in operating costs during the first 20 years of the building. In September 2015, the headquarters was officially moved to Brighton. The building was designed to be innovative and collaborative, where no one has their own office and people are encouraged to work together in open spaces. Snodgrass said, "You wouldn’t think it was a financial institution; you would think it was Google or Facebook or some tech company." The building includes a restaurant and a fitness center.

Membership 
According to the Lake Trust website, membership at Lake Trust Credit Union is open to anyone who lives, works, attends school, or worships within one of the following counties in Michigan: Allegan, Barry, Calhoun, Clare, Clinton, Eaton, Genesee, Gladwin, Gratiot, Hillsdale, Ingham, Ionia, Isabella, Jackson, Kalamazoo, Kent, Lenawee, Livingston, Macomb, Mecosta, Midland, Missaukee, Monroe, Montcalm, Muskegon, Oakland, Osceola, Ottawa, Roscommon, Saginaw, St. Clair, Shiawassee, Van Buren, Washtenaw, or Wayne.

There are also other ways to be eligible for membership:
Retirees from any legal entity located in any of the counties listed above.
Employees, retirees or contractors for DTE Energy or its wholly owned subsidiaries.
Employees of the Utility Workers Union of America.
Employees or members of employer groups or other organized groups which are located within 25 miles of the credit union's main office or a branch office, which office locations are authorized.
Faculty, graduates, students, or employees of the Western Michigan University Cooley Law School.
Employees and retirees of Michigan Grocers Association and Michigan Grocers Services Corporation; plus regular members, associated members, and employees of those members, of the Michigan Grocers Association.
Members of Huron River Area Credit Union at the date of purchase and acquisition of Huron River Area Credit Union.
Any person who receives a retirement annuity, pension, social security, or similar retirement payment from private or government sources, and lives in, or belongs to a retirement organization located in the county, or in a county contiguous to the county where the credit union's principal place of business is located.
Any legal entity that is comprised for the most part of the same general group as the membership of the credit union as outlined above.
Members and immediate families of the foregoing.
A spouse of a deceased member if accepted into membership prior to remarriage.

References

External links 
 
 National Credit Union Administration

Banks established in 1944
1944 establishments in Michigan
Credit unions based in Michigan
Companies based in Brighton, Michigan
Economy of Lansing, Michigan